Zootzensee is a lake in the Rheinsberg Lake Region, Brandenburg, Germany. It lies within the municipality of Rheinsberg.

See also
Großer Prebelowsee
Großer Zechliner See
Schwarzer See
Tietzowsee

Lakes of Brandenburg
Ostprignitz-Ruppin
Federal waterways in Germany
LZootzensee